Trimeresurus tibetanus, commonly known as the Tibetan bamboo pit viper, is a venomous pit viper species found only in Tibet. No subspecies are currently recognized.

Description
Scalation includes 21 (19 or 20) rows of dorsal scales at midbody, 147-152/145-159 ventral scales in males/females, 46-54/40-48 subcaudal scales in males/females, and 7-9 supralabial scales.

Geographic range
Found in Tibet (Tibet Autonomous Region, China). The type locality given is "Xizang Province, Nielamou District, Quekesumou, altitude ". In their English translation of Huang's publication, David and Tong (1997) list the type locality as "Tibet", but give "Naylam, Chokesumo" in the summary.

References

Further reading
David, Patrick, and Haiyan Tong. 1997. Translations of Recent Descriptions of Chinese Pitvipers of the Trimeresurus-complex (Serpentes, Viperidae), with a Key to the Complex in China and Adjacent Areas. Smithsonian Herpetological Information Service (112): 1-31.
 Huang, Zheng-yi. 1982. A New Species of Crotalid Snake from Tibet [in Chinese]. Fudan Journal (Natural Science) 21 (1): 116–118.

External links

Reptiles described in 1982
Endemic fauna of Tibet
Reptiles of China
tibetanus